What're You At? with Tom Power is a Canadian television talk show, which premiered April 5, 2020 on CBC Television. Introduced as a special series during the COVID-19 pandemic in Canada, the series features broadcaster Tom Power remotely interviewing both celebrities and ordinary Canadians from his home studio. The premiere episode included an interview with Dan Levy about the series finale of Schitt's Creek, a musical performance by Jessie Reyez, and a panel discussion with three first responders about efforts to manage the pandemic crisis.

The series takes its name from a common greeting in Newfoundland and Labrador, which Power describes as meaning "How are you?" or "How are you holding up?"

References

2020 Canadian television series debuts
2020s Canadian television talk shows
CBC Television original programming
Television shows about the COVID-19 pandemic